The Rough Guide to Reggae is a world music compilation album originally released in 1997. Part of the World Music Network Rough Guides series, the album gives broad coverage to the reggae genre originating in Jamaica. The album was curated by Steve Barrow, who also wrote the namesake book, and later compiled The Rough Guide to Dub. Phil Stanton, co-founder of the World Music Network, was the producer.

Critical reception

The album received positive reviews upon release. Writing for AllMusic, Keith Farley named it a "stellar introduction", pondering whether the exclusion of Bob Marley was a statement. Michaelangelo Matos of the Chicago Reader called the compilation "definitive", saying it could have been the "fifth disc" of the four-CD Tougher Than Tough box set.

Track listing

References 

1997 compilation albums
World Music Network Rough Guide albums